Poussard v Spiers and Pond (1876) 1 QBD 410 is an English contract law case, concerning the classification of contract terms and wrongful dismissal.

Facts
Madame Poussard agreed in writing to sing and play the lead role at Spiers and Pond's French opera at the Criterion Theatre for £11 a week for three months. This was on condition that the opera ran for three months and started at about 14 November. The letter of engagement read,

“Criterion Theatre, Oct. 16th, 1874.

“To Madame Poussard.

“On behalf of Messrs. Spiers & Pond I engage you to sing and play at the Criterion Theatre on the following terms:—

“You to play the part of Friquette in Lecocq's opera of Les Pres Saint Gervais, commencing on or about the fourteenth of November next, at a weekly salary of eleven pounds (£11), and to continue on at that sum for a period of three months, providing the opera shall run for that period. Then, at the expiration of the said three months, I shall be at liberty to re-engage you at my option, on terms then to be arranged, and not to exceed fourteen pounds per week for another period of three months. Dresses and tights requisite for the part to be provided by the management, and the engagement to be subject to the ordinary rules and regulations of the theatre.

“Ratified: … “E. P. Hingston, Manager.

“Spiers & Pond.

“Madame Poussard, 46, Gunter Grove, Chelsea.”

The first performance was announced for 28 November and Poussard did not object. She came to rehearsals. But because the composer delayed, Poussard did not get the music for the last part of the opera till a few days before the 28th. She was taken ill and did not attend the final rehearsals in the last week. Spiers and Pond engaged another performer, Miss Lewis to be ready to take over if Poussard could not. Miss Lewis would receive a douceur if she was not hired, and £15 a week if she was. Poussard continued to be ill for the first three days. On Thursday 4 December she was well again, but Spiers and Pond refused to have her back. Mr Poussard claimed for wrongful dismissal on his wife's behalf.

At trial before Field J in Middlesex Michaelmas sittings, the jury found that employing Miss L was reasonable under the circumstances. Spiers and Pond were given leave to claim £83 from Poussard. Poussard appealed.

Judgment
Blackburn J (delivering the court's judgment) held that failing to turn up for the first performances entitled Spiers and Pond to rescind the contract, for this went to the root of the matter. Blackburn J stated the facts and then continued.

See also

Cited in argument for Spiers and Pond
Bettini v Gye (1876) 1 QBD 183

Subsequent cases
Torquay Hotel Co Ltd v Cousins [1969] 2 Ch 106

Notes

English termination case law
Lord Blackburn cases
1876 in case law
1876 in British law